The 1986–87 Western Kentucky Hilltoppers men's basketball team represented Western Kentucky University during the 1986–87 NCAA Division I men's basketball season. The Hilltoppers were led by Sun Belt Conference Coach of the Year Murray Arnold and SBC Player of the Year Tellis Frank.  The Hilltoppers started the season by advancing to the finals of the Preseason NIT and then being ranked in the top 10 of both major polls.  WKU won the SBC championship and received a bid to the 1987 NCAA Division I men's basketball tournament.
This team was one of the most talented in school history with three players being drafted in the early rounds of the NBA draft: Frank in the 1st round, Kannard Johnson in the 2nd, and Clarence Martin in the 3rd.  Frank and Johnson were selected to the All-Conference Team; Frank and Brett McNeal made the SBC All-Tournament Team.

Schedule

|-
!colspan=6| Regular Season

|-

 
 

|-
!colspan=6| 1987 Sun Belt Conference men's basketball tournament

|-
!colspan=6| Regular Season

|-
!colspan=6| 1987 NCAA Division I men's basketball tournament

References

Western Kentucky
Western Kentucky Hilltoppers basketball seasons
Western Kentucky
Western Kentucky Basketball, Men's
Western Kentucky Basketball, Men's